Chris Yen Tze-ching (born August 4, 1974) is a Hong Kong martial artist and actress. She is the younger sister of the actor Donnie Yen. She was noted for her roles in the films Protégé de la Rose Noire, Adventures of Johnny Tao: Rock Around the Dragon, and Give 'Em Hell, Malone.

Background
Born in Hong Kong on 4 August 1974 to the newspaper editor father Klyster Yen and the well-known martial artist mother Bow-sim Mark. Both of her parents were also musicians. Her older brother is Donnie Yen. Her family emigrated to Brighton, Massachusetts in 1975.

Yen was trained in martial arts by her mother at the age of 4 and learned piano at the age of 5.

As the age of 10, being the youngest martial artist, Yen won a silver medal at the 1st International Tai Chi Tournament in 1984. Later in 1985, she contested at the First International Wushu Invitational Tournament in Xi'an from 22 to 28 August, she was placed in the third place of the Women's Changquan competition and received a bronze medal.

Yen graduated from Boston University with a double major in psychology and business management.

Personal life
Yen was married to Hong Kong-born American professional race car driver and accountant Hubert Young on March 28, 2009, and they kept two rescue dogs, Rex and Yogi.

She left acting to create a fashion brand. Eight years later, she entered the field of property investment. Yen splits her time between Los Angeles, where she lives with her husband, and Boston, where her parents live.

Filmography

Films

Television dramas

Music videos

Video games

External links

References

1974 births
Living people
Hong Kong people
Chinese tai chi practitioners
Hong Kong film actresses
American film actresses
American television actresses
20th-century Hong Kong actresses
21st-century Hong Kong actresses
21st-century American actresses